Gonzalo Daniel Mazzia (born January 13, 1987, in Rosario, Santa Fe) is an Argentinian football striker playing in Juventud Unida Universitario.

References

External links 
 Gonzalo Mazzia at playmakerstats.com (English version of ceroacero.es)

Living people
1987 births
Argentine footballers
Argentine expatriate footballers
Association football forwards
Expatriate footballers in El Salvador
Argentino de Rosario footballers
C.D. FAS footballers
Footballers from Rosario, Santa Fe